Mézidon Vallée d'Auge (literally Mézidon Valley of Auge) is a commune in the department of Calvados, northwestern France. The municipality was established on 1 January 2017 by merger of the former communes of Mézidon-Canon (the seat), Les Authieux-Papion, Coupesarte, Crèvecœur-en-Auge, Croissanville, Grandchamp-le-Château, Lécaude, Magny-la-Campagne, Magny-le-Freule, Le Mesnil-Mauger, Monteille, Percy-en-Auge, Saint-Julien-le-Faucon and Vieux-Fumé. Mézidon station has rail connections to Argentan, Caen, Lisieux and Rouen.

Population

See also 
 Communes of the Calvados department
 Château de Canon

References 

Mezidonvalleedauge
Populated places established in 2017
2017 establishments in France